The 1971 Sam Houston State Bearkats football team represented Sam Houston State University as a member of the Lone Star Conference (LSC) during the 1971 NAIA Division I football season. Led by fourth-year head coach Tom Page, the Bearkats compiled an overall record of 4–7 with a mark of 3–6 in conference play, and finished tied for sixth in the LSC.

Schedule

References

Sam Houston State
Sam Houston Bearkats football seasons
Sam Houston State Bearkats football